Daniel Owusu (born 25 January 2003) is a Ghanaian professional footballer who plays as a forward for 2. Liga club First Vienna, on loan from Red Bull Salzburg.

Career

WAFA

Youth career 
Owusu began his career with Ghana Premier League side West African Football Academy (WAFA) in Sogakope. He was a member of their youth ranks. He was a member of the WAFA under 16 team that competed in 2018 Next Generation Trophy competition in Salzburg, Austria. He scored 3 goals including scoring one in the final match against Red Bull Brasil to help the team win by 2–0, to win the trophy for the first time after making their fourth appearance at the tournament. The 12-team tournament included U-16 teams from Benfica, FC Bayern München, Flamengo, Rio de Janeiro, FC Viitorul Constanta and Chelsea FC, FC Basel, RB Leipzig, New York Red Bulls, and Southampton FC and hosts Red Bull Akademie. He was adjudged the Most Valuable Player being best player at the end of the tournament.

2018–19 season 
Owusu was promoted to the main team into the senior team in 2019, ahead of the 2019 GFA Special Competition season. He made his professional debut on 31 March 2019 in the first match of the season against Liberty Professionals, playing the full 90-minutes ending in a 3–1 win. He scored his debut goal in a 2–1 victory against Karela United on 10 April 2019. He ended the season with 13 appearances and 1 goal.

2019–20 season 
Owusu was named on the 26 man squad for the premier league season. He scored his first goal of the 2019–20 season and his first goal in the mainstream premier league on 5 January 2020 in his first match of the season against Ebusua Dwarfs after coming on in the 70th minute for Eric Asamany to score with his first touch of the game. He dedicated the goal to his mother in a post-match interview and talked about French footballer Kylian Mbappe's influence on his football career as he saw him as his football idol. Owusu scored his second goal of the season in a dominating 6–1 win over Ashanti Gold, coming on to score in the 82nd minute of the match. He ended the season with 10 appearances and 2 goals as the season was brought to an abrupt end due to the COVID-19 pandemic.

2020–21 season 
Owusu remained a promising figure in the WAFA side in the 2020–21 season. He played his first match on 13 December 2020 coming on as a substitute for Godwin Agbevor in the 55th minute of the 2–0 win against Berekum Chelsea. He subsequently made appearances in WAFA loses against Great Olympics and Legon Cities FC coming on in both matches as a substitute. On 17 January 2021, Owusu came on as a substitute in a thrilling 1–1 draw game against Kumasi Asante Kotoko, with Daniel Lomotey scoring the opener for WAFA. The following week, on 24 January 2021, Owusu was named on the starting line-up for the first time in the season and scored his first goal of the season against Ebusua Dwarfs at the Cape Coast Stadium. He was linked to FC Red Bull Salzburg along with WAFA teammate Forson Amankwah.

FC Red Bull Salzburg 
After being linked to FC Red Bull Salzburg, Owusu was signed along with Forson Amankwah by the Austrian giants on in February 2021. He was signed on 4-year contract to expire on 31 May 2025.

SV Horn (loan) 
FC Red Bull Salzburg announced immediately after signing Owusu, that he had been loaned out to Austrian second-tier side SV Horn for the remainder of the season.

References 

2003 births
People from Volta Region
Living people
Ghanaian footballers
Association football midfielders
West African Football Academy players
FC Red Bull Salzburg players
SV Horn players
FC Liefering players
First Vienna FC players
Ghana Premier League players
2. Liga (Austria) players
Ghanaian expatriate footballers
Expatriate footballers in Austria
Ghanaian expatriate sportspeople in Austria